Desmosterol is a molecule similar to cholesterol. Desmosterol is the immediate precursor of cholesterol in the Bloch pathway of cholesterol biosynthesis. 24-dehydrocholesterol reductase catalyses the reduction of desmosterol to cholesterol. It is accumulated in desmosterolosis.

In 2014, it was named the Molecule of the Year 2012 by the International Society for Molecular and Cell Biology and Biotechnology Protocols and Researches (ISMCBBPR).

See also
 Triparanol

References

Cholestanes